Martin Bednár (born 22 April 1999) is a Slovak professional footballer who plays for ViOn Zlaté Moravce as a midfielder.

Club career

Zemplín Michalovce
Bednár made his Fortuna Liga debut for Zemplín Michalovce in an away fixture against ŽP Šport Podbrezová] on 1 August 2015 at the age of 16. He came on as a stoppage time replacement for Jozef-Šimon Turík. Michalovce lost the game 6:2.

References

External links
 MFK Zemplín Michalovce official profile 
 Futbalnet profile 
 

 

1999 births
Living people
Sportspeople from Prešov
Slovak footballers
Slovakia youth international footballers
Slovakia under-21 international footballers
Association football midfielders
MFK Zemplín Michalovce players
FC DAC 1904 Dunajská Streda players
FC ViOn Zlaté Moravce players
Slovak Super Liga players